KQPW-LP was a non-commercial low-power FM Christian radio station licensed to West Quincy, Missouri in the United States of America, broadcasting with 100 watts of effective radiated power on 102.5 MHz. The station licensee, School of Christ, a small private Christian school in Quincy, Illinois, was granted a construction permit from the Federal Communications Commission on November 26, 2001, with the stated purpose "to further the Gospel of Christ to our students and the surrounding area" and "to instruct those students and other interested area youth in the field of radio electronics and production". The station went on the air and applied for a license to cover in August 2002, and the FCC granted this license in September. The station used the slogan "Quincy's True Power Station". KQPW-LP is no longer broadcasting as the FCC canceled its license on June 21, 2006.

Programming
The station's programming included techno music with a priest speaking Bible verses on top.  The primary broadcast service area was Quincy, Illinois, across the Mississippi River.

References

External links
KQPW official website
 
On the Radio.Net: KQPW 102.5 FM

KQPW
QPW
QPW-LP
Defunct radio stations in the United States
Radio stations established in 2002
2002 establishments in Missouri
Defunct religious radio stations in the United States
Radio stations disestablished in 2006
2006 disestablishments in Missouri
QPW-LP